The Man in Search of His Murderer is a 1931 German comedy film directed by Robert Siodmak and starring Heinz Rühmann, Lien Deyers and Hans Leibelt. The film is partially lost; of the original 9 acts only five (50 minutes) are left. It was one of the early leading roles for upcoming German star Heinz Rühmann. Co-writer Billy Wilder was at the beginning of his long career. It was shot at the Babelsberg Studios in Berlin and premiered at the city's Gloria-Palast. The film's sets were designed by the art director Robert Herlth and Walter Röhrig. It was remade in 1952 as You Only Live Once.

Cast

See also
 Tribulations of a Chinaman in China (novel by Jules Verne, 1879)
 Flirting with Fate (1916)
 The Whistler (1944)
 You Only Live Once (1952)
 Five Days (1954)
 Up to His Ears (1965)
 Tulips (1981)
 I Hired a Contract Killer (1990)
 Bulworth (1998)
 Shut Up and Shoot Me (2005)

References

Bibliography

External links

1931 films
1931 comedy films
Films of the Weimar Republic
German comedy films
1930s German-language films
Films scored by Franz Waxman
Films scored by Friedrich Hollaender
Films directed by Robert Siodmak
German films based on plays
Films with screenplays by Billy Wilder
Films about contract killing
Films about suicide
German black-and-white films
UFA GmbH films
Films produced by Erich Pommer
1930s German films
Films shot at Babelsberg Studios